She Moves was an American pop trio consisting of Carla Duren, Danielle Flora, and Diana Bologna, who were all former New York Knicks City Dancers.

History
Danielle got her industry start as a dancer and host of the popular 1990s MTV show The Grind, while Diana had danced in music videos for Salt N Pepa, Lil' Kim, and Missy Elliott.

In 1997 the German-born New York-based producers Berman Brothers, who produced Real McCoy's multi-platinum-selling debut, formed She Moves, months after they heard Carla wow the crowd at Madison Square Garden before a playoff game with her soulful a cappella rendition of the national anthem.

In the summer of 1997, the group released their debut single, "Breaking All the Rules". It peaked at #32 on the Billboard Hot 100. On November 18, 1997, their debut album of the same title was released. Sales were poor despite the successful single on radio and exposure on BET and MTV. The group performed the single during the swimsuit competition at Miss USA 1998. Geffen Records followed with the single "It's Your Love", a remake of the country music hit by Tim McGraw and Faith Hill. The label released a third single from the album, "Just for Tonight", but it failed to chart. The girls also appeared in a Saturday Night Live sketch. Geffen Records dropped the trio from the label in 1999.

Danielle went on to become a successful choreographer working with pop icon Janet Jackson on mtvICON as well as the MTV Video Music Awards and for Saturday Night Live (NBC). Danielle hosted two shows for Billboard: "Billboard in Sixty"  and "Billboard Underground" . , The Tonight Show, Lip Sync Battle to name a few. 
 
On Broadway, Carla performed the role of Snookie in "110 in the Shade". She released her debut album titled "BlackFolkRockStar" on CD Baby. Diana is now an actress and appeared in the feature film Brooklyn's Finest, HBO's Flight of the Conchords, and As the World Turns.

Discography

Albums
1997: Breaking All the Rules

Singles

References

External links
Yahoo Group with photos and audio.
IUMA Photos and MP3 download.

American pop music groups
American soul musical groups
American girl groups
Geffen Records artists